Hårek Ludvig Hansen (14 July 1901 – 1 March 1996) was a Norwegian politician for the Conservative Party.

He was elected to the Norwegian Parliament from Nordland in 1945, but was not re-elected in 1949.

Born in Tjøtta, Hansen was a member of Alstahaug municipal council from 1963 to 1965.

Outside politics he mainly worked as a fisher and farmer.

References

1901 births
1996 deaths
Members of the Storting
Conservative Party (Norway) politicians
Nordland politicians
20th-century Norwegian politicians